Cyril James Thomas (August 5, 1926 — January 2, 2009) was a Welsh-born Canadian professional ice hockey player who played 14 games in the National Hockey League with the Chicago Black Hawks and Toronto Maple Leafs during the 1947–48 season. The rest of his career, which lasted from 1946 to 1952, was spent in various minor leagues. Born in Dowlais, Wales, he moved to Canada as a child.

Career statistics

Regular season and playoffs

See also
 List of National Hockey League players from the United Kingdom

External links

1926 births
2009 deaths
Alberta Golden Bears ice hockey players
Calgary Stampeders (ice hockey) players
Chicago Blackhawks players
People from Dowlais
Sportspeople from Merthyr Tydfil County Borough
Pittsburgh Hornets players
Saskatoon Quakers players
Toronto Maple Leafs players
Welsh emigrants to Canada